Maximilian Joseph Eugene Auguste Napoleon de Beauharnais, 3rd Duke of Leuchtenberg, Prince Romanowsky (2 October 1817 – 1 November 1852) was the husband of Grand Duchess Maria Nikolayevna of Russia and first cousin of Emperors Napoleon III of the French and Francis Joseph I of Austria. He was a grandson of Napoleon I's first wife, the Empress Josephine, by her prior marriage to Alexandre de Beauharnais.

A student of Moritz von Jacobi, he is known as one of pioneers in galvanoplasty and an expert in copper and bronze metalworks generally, as well as an art collector.

Childhood

He was born as the second son of Eugène de Beauharnais, Duke of Leuchtenberg and Prince of Eichstätt and Princess Augusta Amalia Ludovika Georgia of Bavaria. His maternal grandparents were Maximilian I, King of Bavaria and his first wife Marie Wilhelmine Auguste, Landgravine of Hesse-Darmstadt.

His maternal grandmother Marie Wilhelmine Auguste was a daughter of Georg Wilhelm of Hesse-Darmstadt, younger son of Louis VIII, Landgrave of Hesse-Darmstadt.

He was a brother of:
Auguste de Beauharnais, Prince consort of Maria II of Portugal;
Amélie de Beauharnais, Empress consort of Pedro I of Brazil;
Josephine of Leuchtenberg, Queen consort of Oscar I of Sweden.

Duke of Leuchtenberg
His maternal grandfather Maximilian of Bavaria appointed  his father, Eugène de Beauharnais, 1st Duke of Leuchtenberg on 14 November 1817. The title came with the effective administration of the Principality of Eichstätt. Maximilian was named "Prince of Leuchtenberg" and became the second-in-line heir to the Duchy.

On 21 February 1824, his father died and his older brother became Auguste de Beauharnais, Duke of Leuchtenberg. His brother was yet childless and Maximilian became his Heir Presumptive.

Auguste eventually married Queen Maria II of Portugal but died childless on 28 March 1835. Maximilian became the 3rd Duke of Leuchtenberg at this point.

Marriage

He married Grand Duchess Maria Nikolayevna of Russia on 2 July 1839 in the chapel of the Winter Palace. She was the eldest daughter of Nicholas I of Russia and Charlotte of Prussia.

His father-in-law Nicholas I granted to him on 14 July 1839 the Russian and Finnish style Imperial Highness, a rank he was entitled to as a descendant of the extended dynasty of Napoleon I of France. His father was an adoptive son of Napoleon.

Children

 Princess Alexandra Maximilianovna (1840–1843), died in childhood
 Princess Maria Maximilianovna (1841–1914) m. Prince Wilhelm of Baden (1829–1897), younger son of Leopold, Grand Duke of Baden
 Nicholas Maximilianovich, 4th Duke of Leuchtenberg (1843–1891) m. Nadezhda Annenkova (1840-1891)
 Princess Eugenia Maximilianovna (1845–1925) m. Duke Alexander Petrovich of Oldenburg (1844–1932)
 Eugen Maximilianovich, Duke of Leuchtenberg (1847–1901) m.(1) Daria Opotchinina (1845–1870) m.(2) Zinaida Skobeleva (1856–1899)
  (1849–1877). Killed in the  Russo-Turkish War of 1877-1878.
 Georgi Maximilianovich, Duke of Leuchtenberg (1852–1912) m.(1) Duchess Therese Petrovna of Oldenburg (1852–1883) m.(2) Princess Anastasia of Montenegro (1868–1935)

Further descendants
Through his oldest surviving daughter Princess Maria Maximilianovna of Leuchtenberg (1841–1914), he is the grandfather of Prince Maximilian of Baden (1867–1929), Chancellor of Germany during World War I, and Princess Marie of Baden, the last Duchess consort of Anhalt.

His youngest daughter Princess Eugenia Maximilianovna of Leuchtenberg (1845–1925) married Duke Alexander Petrovich of Oldenburg (1844–1932), the grandson of Grand Duchess Catherine Pavlovna of Russia, and became the mother of Duke Peter Alexandrovich of Oldenburg (1868–1924), the divorced husband of Grand Duchess Olga Alexandrovna of Russia (1882–1960), the youngest sister of Nicholas II of Russia.

Honours

Ancestry

References

External links

1817 births
1852 deaths
Nobility from Munich
Maximilian
3
Members of the Bavarian Reichsrat
Russian people of German descent
Russian people of French descent
Commanders of the Order of the Sword
Burials at St. Michael's Church, Munich